Thomas Duxbury (15 June 1896–1971) was an English footballer who played in the Football League for Leeds United and Preston North End. At Preston, Duxbury played in the 1922 FA Cup Final.

References

1896 births
1971 deaths
English footballers
Association football midfielders
English Football League players
Accrington Stanley F.C. (1891) players
Preston North End F.C. players
Leeds United F.C. players
Fleetwood Town F.C. players
FA Cup Final players